is a Japanese racing driver. In 2017, he was crowned champion in the Japanese Formula 3 Championship.

Career

Junior Racing & Formula Racing
Takaboshi started his career in karting in 1998, in which he remained active until 2009. He mainly raced in Japanese championships and won a number of titles. In 2010 he switched to formula racing and competed in the Formula Challenge Japan, in which he competed until 2012. In his first season, he scored no points and his best result was ninth at the Fuji Speedway. In 2011, he improved himself to seventh in the final standings with 22 points and a podium finish. 2012 would prove to be his best season in the class, with two wins at the Twin Ring Motegi and the Suzuka International Racing Course, as well as four other podium finishes. With 65 points, he finished third in the final standings behind Nobuharu Matsushita and Ryō Hirakawa.

In 2013, Takaboshi made his Formula 3 debut in the Japanese Formula 3 Championship, playing as a protégé of Nissan for the NDDP Racing team in the national class. He won eleven races in this class and finished second in the remaining four races to win the convincing championship with 163 points. His results also qualified for the main division, where four fifth places were his best results. He finished seventh overall with 9 points.

In 2014, Takaboshi competed in the Japanese Formula 3 premier class, driving for the B-MAX Racing Team with NDDP. He won three races at Suzuka, Fuji and Motegi and was on the podium in four other races. With 82 points, he finished third in the standings behind Nobuharu Matsushita and Kenta Yamashita. At the end of the year he also drove for B-MAX in the Macau Grand Prix, finishing eighteenth.

In 2015, Takaboshi won the Japanese Formula 3 season opener in Suzuka, adding two more wins later in the year at the Okayama International Circuit. He was on the podium nine more times in the rest of the season. With 92 points, he was again third in the championship behind Nick Cassidy and Kenta Yamashita.  At the end of the year, Takaboshi again took part in the Macau Grand Prix, but did not finish the race.

In addition for 2016, he drove in half of the Japanese Formula 3 races with the B-MAX Racing Team with NDDP, winning two races at Suzuka and one at Okayama. Although he missed half the races, he finished fourth overall with 42 points behind Kenta Yamashita, Jann Mardenborough and Sho Tsuboi. In 2017, Takaboshi returned as a full-time driver in Japanese Formula 3 with the B-MAX Racing Team with NDDP. He won seven races: three at Okayama, two at Suzuka and two at Fuji, as well as finishing on the podium in nine other races. He became champion in class with 148 points. 

For 2020, Takaboshi returned to open wheel Formula racing, competed with B-Max Racing race in 2020 Super Formula Championship for one round in the second race of the season. He replaces Teppei Natori who raced for 1 round but unable to continue due to medical condition. And also he competed in 2020 Super Formula Lights with the same team. He returned once again in 2021 for Super Formula, but this time he covered up Ryo Hirakawa for Team Impul due to Hirakawa tests Toyota Gazoo Racing Europe's Toyota GR010 Hybrid car.

Super GT & Endurance Racing
Takaboshi made his debut in 2015 competed in the GT300 class of the Super GT at NDDP Racing, sharing a Nissan GT-R GT3 with Kazuki Hoshino. The duo won two races at the Chang International Circuit and Autopolis, and also scored a podium at Fuji. They finished fourth in the final standings with 61 points.

In 2016, Takaboshi made the move to Europe, where he competed in both the Blancpain GT Series Sprint Cup and Blancpain GT Series Endurance Cup for Nissan GT Academy Team RJN. In the Sprint Cup he shared a Nissan GT-R Nismo GT3 with Alex Buncombe, while in the Endurance Cup he shared the same car with Buncombe and Lucas Ordóñez. In the Sprint Cup, a ninth place in the qualifying race on the Circuit de Barcelona-Catalunya was his best finish, leaving him scoreless in 33rd place in the championship. In the Endurance Cup, he achieved a podium finish in the season final at the Nürburgring to finish ninth overall with 39 points. In the Super GT, he also drove in three GT300 class races with the Dijon Racing team in a Nissan GT-R GT3, where he shared a car with Takayuki Aoki. Tenth place at Motegi was his best result and he was 28th in the championship with 1 point. Within the Super GT, he also made his GT500 debut in the race at Suzuka with the MOLA team, sharing a Nissan GT-R with Satoshi Motoyama as a one-time replacement for Katsumasa Chiyo. They finished the race in third place, making Takaboshi seventeenth in the final standings with 13 points.

For 2017, he also returned to Super GT with NDDP Racing and again shared a Nissan GT-R GT3 with Kazuki Hoshino for 2017. With a sixth place at Fuji as his best result, he finished seventeenth in the final standings.

In 2018, Takaboshi only competed in the Super GT, in which he made a permanent switch to the GT500 class to share a Nissan GT-R with João Paulo de Oliveira with the Kondo Racing team. Their best results were three sixth places at Okayama, Fuji and the Sportsland SUGO, leaving them with 23 points. Stayed with the same team, but he's teamed up with fellow Nissan driver Jann Mardenborough for 2019 & 2020. For 2021, with Kondo Racing teamed with Daiki Sasaki.

Racing record

Career summary

References

External link
 

1993 births
Living people
Japanese racing drivers
Japanese Formula 3 Championship drivers
Super Formula drivers
Super GT drivers
Formula Challenge Japan drivers
Blancpain Endurance Series drivers
Kondō Racing drivers
Nismo drivers
Motopark Academy drivers
Nürburgring 24 Hours drivers
B-Max Racing drivers